Babarsari or also known as Babarsari Gotham City is an settlement and road section which is located in Caturtunggal Village, Depok District, Sleman Regency, Special Region of Yogyakarta, Indonesia. This area is one of night entertainment centers in Yogyakarta.

History
Babarsari is surrounding by many universities such as Atma Jaya University of Yogyakarta and National Development University "Veteran" of Yogyakarta, making it a multiethnic area inhabited by many migrants, especially those from Eastern Indonesia. This is because Babarsari is a dormitory for students studying in Yogyakarta as well as a nightlife center.

List of clashes

2007 Student clash
This clash between students occurred in the Babarsari area on Friday, 29 June 2007 at noon. The clashes involved two groups of private university students, both of whom came from outside Yogyakarta.

A group of students from outside Yogyakarta suddenly came and attacked another student from outside Yogyakarta at a boarding house in the Tambakbayan area, Babarsari Village, Sleman Regency on Friday afternoon. As a result of the clash, three people suffered stab wounds, two in the head and one in the chest.

2012 Residents with Students from Timor Leste clash 
This riot occurred on Tuesday, May 8, 2012, which allegedly involved residents around Babarsari with a group of students from Timor Leste. The chronology begins when a student from Timor Leste refuses to pay for parking in front of the Illuzion Internet Cafe and is then reprimanded by the parking attendant. The student who did not accept the reprimand was also involved in a fight with the parking attendant.

Out of emotion, the student then returned to his dormitory. Not long after, the young man returned to the location with his group of friends carrying a machete. Out of emotion, the student slashed the parking attendant who was on guard who was also a resident of Babarsari village.

Residents who knew about the incident did not accept it, the villagers then carried out a sweep to the Timor Leste student dormitory. But the students could not be found in the dormitory. Until at 01.00 in the morning, dozens of youths from Timor Leste invaded the Babarsari area. Several houses were pelted with stones, causing the windows to shatter. Several cars and motorbikes belonging to residents were also damaged.

On the same night, at the location around the riot, two young men and a woman were stabbed in the Selokan Mataram area. From the riots, it was reported that 2 peoples died and 1 was injured. It didn't stop there, an ATM in front of the YKPN High School was also broken into and then vandalized.

2018 Papua and Maluku residents clash
The clashes in Babarsari happened again in 2018. Two mass groups each from Papua and Maluku clashed on Wednesday, 12 September 2018. The riots started when there was a commotion in a cafe on Jalan Perumnas Seturan, Caturtunggal on Wednesday, 12 September 2018 at around 02.30 WIB. As a result of the commotion, one Papuan person was injured.

A group of people from Papua took to the streets carrying sharp weapons, iron, and also wood. They walked from Puluhdadi in Condongcatur to Babarsari In Caturtunggal, to look for the perpetrator who caused his friend to be injured by a sharp weapon.

2022 Online Motorcycle Drivers with Debt Collector clash
The atmosphere was tense again after clashes occurred between hundreds of online motorcycle taxi mobs and a number of people suspected of being debt collectors at the Grab Yogyakarta office.

The beginning of the incident began when one of the motorcycle taxi drivers came online, saw his colleague dressed as an online motorcycle taxi was dismissed by two people who claimed to be debt collectors, on Wahid Hasyim Road, Condongcatur, Sleman, on Tuesday, 3 March 2020. Seeing this incident, he tried to intervene and asked his friend whose motorbike was about to be pulled by a debt collector to go first.

At that time a debt collector called his friends, and as soon as they arrived at the location they immediately beat up the online motorcycle taxi. As a result of the persecution, an online motorcycle taxi driver, dozens of online motorcycle taxi drivers stormed the offices of debt collectors on Wednesday, 4 March 2022. Then a group of debt collectors took countermeasures by visiting the Grab Office on Thursday, 6 March 2020. The two warring parties ended up throwing stones at each other at that location.

2022 AMKEI and Melanesia clash
This riot involved two groups between AMKEI and Melanesia. The riots that occurred in Babarsari were actually not caused by the residents of Yogyakarta themselves, but rather by conflicting external groups.

The riots started with the persecution of a Papuan citizen on Saturday 2 July 2022 in the morning. The incident started on Saturday July 2, 2022 at 01.45 WIB at Glow Karaoke, There was a fight between Luis' group (residents of NTT) and Kece's group (residents of Maluku). Previously, Luis and his men refused to pay karaoke money and chose to leave the place at 01.30 early days. So this provoked the anger of Kece and his men and a fight broke out in front of and inside the karaoke place.

Inside the karaoke room the damage occurred involving two computer monitors damaged by a sharp weapon attack by Luis group. After doing some damage inside and outside the karaoke, the two then left the scenes. Two hours later, at around 03.05 local time, Luis and his crew of about 30 people came back to Glow Karaoke and re-doing damage by destroying the windshield using a blunt sharp weapon. Not only that, Luis and his men continued their search by visiting Kece's residence at Jambusari Housing in Ngemplak at around 05.10 local time.

The ramming incident led to a mistargeting which resulted fatally on a student from Timika Papua named Diblirian Jornes Tawarisi Rumbewas suffered injuries in the form of a severed right hand, a broken left hand shell and an incision wound on his leg.

References

Sleman Regency
Districts of the Special Region of Yogyakarta